Niphona andamana is a species of beetle in the family Cerambycidae. It was described by Stephan von Breuning in 1974. It is known from the Andaman Islands.

References

andamana
Beetles described in 1974